Coenocharopa is a genus of very small air-breathing land snails, terrestrial pulmonate gastropod mollusks in the family Charopidae, superfamily Punctoidea.

Species
Species within the genus Coenocharopa include: 
 Coenocharopa aculeata
 Coenocharopa alata
 Coenocharopa elegans
 Coenocharopa macromphala
 Coenocharopa multiradiata
 Coenocharopa parvicostata
 Coenocharopa sordidus
 Coenocharopa yessabahensis

References

External links 
 Taxonomy here: 
 
 Coenocharopa at Biolib.cz

 
Charopidae
Gastropod genera
Taxonomy articles created by Polbot